The Torneio Norte-Nordeste (English: North-Northeast Tournament) was a football competition held between 1968 and 1971. In 1968 and 1969, it was played exclusively by North Tournament champion and the Northeast Tournament. In 1970, the tournament was played on a quadrangular basis involving four clubs.

In 1971 the fourth edition of the tournament was held, but with the start of the Campeonato Brasileiro, which was attended some of the most important Northeast clubs, the 4th edition of the Torneio Norte-Nordeste was renamed Campeonato Nacional Norte-Nordeste (English: National North-Northeast Tournament).

The competition received the designation of "National North-Northeast" to aggregate the clubs of the two regions, which were not in dispute with the  elite division of the national championship. Giving the 1971 North-Northeast champion (Clube do Remo) the right to dispute the first National Final of the 1st division (current Campeonato Brasileiro Série B).

Results

References

Recurring sporting events established in 1968
Recurring events disestablished in 1971
1968 establishments in Brazil
1971 disestablishments in Brazil